Ji-hye, also spelled Jee-hye, Ji-hae, Jee-hae, Ji-hay, or Jee-hay, is a Korean feminine given name. The meaning differs based on the hanja used to write each syllable of the name. There are 61 hanja with the reading "ji" and 23 hanja with the reading "hye" on the South Korean government's official list of hanja which may be used in given names. It also means "wisdom" in Korean. Ji-hye was the most popular name for newborn girls in South Korea in 1980, 1988, and 1990.

People
People with this name include:
Ryu Ji-hae (born 1976), South Korean table tennis player
Yoon Ji-hye (born 1979), South Korean actress
Lee Ji-hye (born 1980), South Korean singer and actress
Han Ji-hye (born 1984), South Korean actress
Lim Ji-hye (born 1985), South Korean weightlifter
Seo Ji-hye (born 1984), South Korean actress
Ji-Hae Park (born 1985), German-born South Korean violinist
Wang Ji-hye (born 1985), South Korean actress
Ahn Ji-hye (born 1987), South Korean actress
Yun Ji-hye (born 1997), South Korean taekwondo practitioner

Fictional characters
Fictional characters with this name include:
Choe Ji-hye, in 1992 South Korean film Marriage Story
Ji-hye, in 2003 South Korean film The Classic
Song Ji-hye, in 2013 South Korean television series Goddess of Marriage

See also
List of Korean given names

References

Korean feminine given names